Feasting on Asphalt is a television series starring Alton Brown of the Food Network programs Good Eats and Iron Chef America.

Brown's third series, Feasting on Asphalt explores "road food" (eating establishments which cater to travelers) in the historical and present-day United States, with an emphasis on unique restaurants and regional cuisine. In the first two seasons, Brown and his crew seek "good eats" across the country, via Brown's BMW motorcycle. "As far as I’m concerned, there’s no better way to experience the road than from the back of a bike," says Brown. During the third season (titled Feasting on Waves), Brown trades the motorcycle for a boat to island hop throughout the Caribbean with a similar mission.

Season 1
Season 1 consisted of four episodes, initially broadcast July 29, August 5, August 12, and August 19, 2006 (Shot Spring/Summer '06).  Brown traveled from the Atlantic Ocean to the Pacific Ocean, and sampled food along his travel route. The episodes included segments documenting famous journeys and travelers (from the Odyssey to the Crusades, to Lewis and Clark, and Jack Kerouac), and interviews with many of the restaurant owners and patrons he met en route.

Brown suffered a motorcycle crash during the shooting of the Nevada segment, injuring his right clavicle. This injury was caught on camera and was shown in episode 4.

Brown began his trip in Mount Pleasant, SC, then wound his way through Georgia, South Carolina, North Carolina, Tennessee, Kentucky, Indiana, Missouri, Kansas, Colorado, Utah, Arizona, Nevada and then to the California coast.

Episode 1
Title: "The South Shall Fry Again"

Places Visited:

Episode 2
Title:  "I Smell Pork"

Places Visited:

Episode 3
Title:  "High Plains Feaster"

Places Visited:

Episode 4
Title:  "California or Bust"

Places Visited:

Note:  Coordinates were incorrectly shown in ddmmss format on the program.

Alton Brown is shown wearing a sling for three quarters of this episode after his motorcycle accident in Nevada and resulting shoulder injury. On the sling is written: "If you can read this odds are I'm about to scream." The Chicago Tribune said of the incident that Brown was "surely the only Food Network celeb to have broken bones in a motorcycle crash on camera".

Season 2
The second season, Feasting on Asphalt 2 – The River Run, began airing August 4, 2007 on the Food Network. The journey began in Venice, Louisiana, with Brown and his crew tracing the Mississippi River north.  According to Brown's website, Feasting on Asphalt 2 was filmed during April and May 2007, and consists of six episodes along the Great River Road. Brown deviates from the Great River Road, however, missing several of the cities that travel along the Mississippi River; rather than following the river through towns such as Grand Rapids, Minnesota, and Bemidji, Minnesota, Brown cuts straight over from Crosby, Minnesota to Itasca State Park in order to reach the source of the Mississippi River.

Episode 1
Title:  "A Strong Brown God"

According to Brown, a strong brown god is a term used by T. S. Eliot to describe the Mississippi River.

Places Visited:

Episode 2
Title:  "Fry Me a River"

Places Visited:

Episode 3
Title:  "Soul Food Survivor"

Places Visited:

Episode 4
Title:  "Take Me To The River"

Places Visited:

Episode 5
Title:  "Mid-American Pie"

Places Visited:

Episode 6
Title:  "Lutefisk Express"

Places Visited:

Season 3
The third season uses the title Feasting on Waves as Brown travels the Caribbean by boat in search of local cuisine with less emphasis on established restaurants and more roadside stands and visits to residents' kitchens.

 Sugar on Isle One: a visit to Saint Kitts, Brown seeks traditional foods from roadside stands, street vendors, and homes of locals.  Dishes explored include a bush tea created from fragrant grasses foraged from the roadside
 Fungi with Foraging and Fish: a visit to Saint Martin / St Maarten and a lolo stand, brews a local drink called mauby, and helps a local family prepare a boiled fish feast with local ingredients and traditions.
 Island Thyme: Brown sails on to discover "perfect" foods and home made wines made from unexpected ingredients. Sea life becomes the focus as the exploration moves below the surface.
 Won Love: Traditional family recipes and a friendly church social are just a couple of the places AB finds the "best sauce" which turns out to be the main ingredient of all of his travels.

Motorcycles and gear

Season 1
In the series, Alton Brown is seen riding a BMW R1200RT, a touring motorcycle, with a number of accessories.  He wears a variety of gear including textile jackets or suits made by BMW, Aerostich, and Vanson, and Aerostich "Combat Touring" boots.  His web site lists his motorcycle and camping gear, much of it procured from Aerostich.  His motorcycle was purchased used from a BMW dealer and has made prior appearances on Good Eats.
Its fate following the accident outside Las Vegas has not been divulged.

Season 2
For Season 2 Alton Brown and his crew rode the BMW R1200GS, a dual-sport motorcycle. He is seen outfitted with BMW motorcycle apparel.

Book
The River Run series became a book in 2008.

References

Bibliography

Further reading

External links

 
 
Feasting on Asphalt at Metacritic

Food Network original programming
Motorcycle television series
Food travelogue television series
2006 American television series debuts
2008 American television series endings